Trox confluens is a species of hide beetle in the subfamily Troginae. Within the genus Trox, it is placed in the subgenus Granulitrox. Though this species is disputed, with some taxonomists arguing T. confluens is merely a duplicate of Trox granulipennis, the general consensus is that T. confluens and T. granulipennis are distinct. This beetle lives in Algeria, the Canary Islands, Libya, Morocco, and Tunisia.

References

confluens
Beetles described in 1864